The following is a list of journals in the field of psychiatry. Psychiatry journals generally publish articles with either a general focus (meaning all aspects of psychiatry are included) or with a more specific focus. This list includes notable psychiatry articles  sorted by name and focus within psychiatry.

 
Psychiatry
Psychiatry j